Valentin Oehen (26 June 1931 – 2 June 2022) was a Swiss politician. He was a member of the National Action against the Alienation of the People and the Home (renamed later in Swiss Democrats, DS).

Biography
Oehen served in the National Council from 1971 to 1987, where he represented the Canton of Bern.

In May 1988, Oehen announced his retirement from his political career, which concluded when his term in the Grand Council of Ticino expired in 1991.

Valentin Oehen died in Nottwil on 2 June 2022 at the age of 91.

References

1931 births
2022 deaths
20th-century Swiss politicians
Members of the National Council (Switzerland)
Swiss Democrats politicians
People from Sursee District